Baroness Ella van Heemstra,  (12 June 190026 August 1984) was a Dutch aristocrat and the mother of actress Audrey Hepburn. After her marriage to Joseph Victor Anthony Ruston, she became a British citizen.

Biography
Ella van Heemstra was a Dutch aristocrat and the third of five daughters of Baron Aarnoud van Heemstra, who was mayor of Arnhem from 1910 to 1920 and served as Governor of Suriname between 1921 and 1928. Ella's mother was Elbrig Willemine Henriette, Baroness van Asbeck (1873–1939), who was a granddaughter of jurist Count Dirk van Hogendorp. She spent much of her childhood at Huis Doorn.

Personal life
Van Heemstra was married and divorced twice, and had three children.

Aged 19, Van Heemstra married Jonkheer Hendrik Gustaaf Adolf Quarles van Ufford (1894–1955). They divorced in 1925. Van Heemstra had two sons from this marriage, both of whom were born in the Dutch East Indies:

 Jonkheer Arnoud Robert Alexander Quarles van Ufford (1920–1979), married to Maria Margaretha Monné (1919–2006), with issue:

  Michael Allan Quarles van Ufford (born 17 July 1945)
  Evelyn Joyce Quarles van Ufford (born 2 August 1947)

 Jonkheer Ian Edgar Bruce Quarles van Ufford (1924–2010), married to Yvonne Scholtens (1928–2000), with issue:
 Audrey Yvonne Quarles van Ufford (born 10 May 1954)
 Sandra Claire Quarles van Ufford (born 15 October 1958)
 Andrew Ian Quarles van Ufford (born 6 January 1967)

Van Heemstra married secondly Joseph Victor Anthony Ruston (1889–1980) (later Hepburn-Ruston) on 24 September 1926 at Batavia, Java, Dutch East Indies. They were divorced on 24 June 1939 and had one daughter:

 Audrey Kathleen Ruston (4 May 1929 – 20 January 1993), commonly known as Audrey Hepburn

Van Heemstra was an early supporter of Adolf Hitler and his Nazi regime, penning several articles in praise of the fascist leader.

Later life
In the early 1960s she lived in Los Angeles with her friend Leonard Gershe, and then later in San Francisco, where she did volunteer work for soldiers coming back from Vietnam.

When she visited Los Angeles she was entertained by friends like George Cukor, Mrs. Mildred Knopf (wife of Edwin H. Knopf) and Veronique Peck. She spent the rest of her life in her daughter's house in Tolochenaz, Switzerland where she died in 1984. Audrey accompanied her mother's body to the Netherlands for funeral.

Honours
Ella was named Dame of the  Most Venerable Order of the Hospital of Saint John of Jerusalem by Queen Elizabeth II on 7 September 1971.

Ancestry

References

External links
 

1900 births
1984 deaths
Ella
Ella
Van Hogendorp (family)
Dames of the Order of St John
Baronesses of the Netherlands
Dutch expatriates in England
Dutch expatriates in the United States
People from Rheden
People from Arnhem